Xinjing may refer to:

Heart Sutra or Xinjing (心經), a Chinese-language sutra in Mahāyāna Buddhism

Places in China
Changchun, the capital city of Jilin, known as Xinjing (新京) during the Manchukuo era (1932–1945)
Xinjing Township (新景乡), a township in Tongwei County, Gansu

Towns
Xinjing, Guangxi (新靖), in Jingxi, Guangxi
Xinjing, Guizhou (新景), in Yanhe Tujia Autonomous County, Guizhou
Xinjing, Shanghai (新泾), in Changning District, Shanghai

See also
Xinjiang (disambiguation)
Xingjing (disambiguation)